Lennart Andersson can refer to:

 Lennart Axelsson (musician), Swedish musician born 1941.
 Lennart Axelsson (politician), Swedish politician born 1953.